Dearbhlá Walsh (born 1993-1994) is a British model and beauty queen, best known for winning Miss Earth Northern Ireland 2015 which gives her the right to represent Northern Ireland in Miss Earth 2015 pageant.

Biography

Miss Earth Northern Ireland 2015
Dearbhla joined the Miss Earth Northern Ireland 2015 pageant where she represented County Londonderry. The pageant took place on 12 July 2015 at the Luxurious Hotel. She was declared as the Northern Ireland's winner for 2015.

Miss Earth 2015
Winning Miss Earth Northern Ireland for 2015, Dearbhlá is Northern Ireland's representative to be Miss Earth 2015 and would try to succeed Jamie Herrell as the next Miss Earth.

External links
Dearbhlá at Miss Earth UK website

References

1994 births
Living people
Miss Earth 2015 contestants
British beauty pageant winners